Dennis Amato (born 26 June 1980) is a German football manager and former footballer. He was most recently manager of Thai League 1 club Sukhothai.

Career

In 2016, he was appointed manager of Chainat Hornbill.

Managerial statistics

 Results from penalty shoot-outs are counted as draws in this table.

Honours

Manager
Chainat Hornbill
 Thai League 2 Champion (1); 2017

Chiangmai United
 Thai League 2 Runners-up (1); 2020-21

Sukhothai
 Thai League 2 Runners-up (1); 2021-22

References

External links
Dennis Amato at Soccerway

1980 births
Living people
Expatriate football managers in Thailand
German football managers
Association football central defenders
German footballers
VfR Mannheim players
1. FSV Mainz 05 II players